The 2015–16 New Mexico Lobos women's basketball team will represent the University of New Mexico during the 2015–16 NCAA Division I women's basketball season. The Lobos, led by fifth year head coach Yvonne Sanchez. They play their home games at The Pit with one game at Johnson Gymnasium and were a members of the Mountain West Conference. They finished the season 17–15, 9–9 in Mountain West play to finish in a tie for fifth place. They advanced to the semifinals of the Mountain West women's tournament where they lost to Colorado State. They were invited to the Women's Basketball Invitational where they lost to North Dakota in the first round.

On March 18, the school fired Yvonne Sanchez. She finished at New Mexico with a 5 year record of 77–81.

Roster

Schedule and results

|-
!colspan=9 style="background:#D3003F; color:white;"| Exhibition

|-
!colspan=9 style="background:#D3003F; color:white;"| Non-conference regular season

|-
!colspan=9 style="background:#D3003F; color:white;"| Mountain West regular season

|-
!colspan=9 style="background:#D3003F; color:white;"|  Mountain West Women's Tournament

|-
!colspan=9 style="background:#D3003F; color:white;"|  WBI

See also
2015–16 New Mexico Lobos men's basketball team

References 

New Mexico
New Mexico Lobos women's basketball seasons
New Mexico
2015 in sports in New Mexico
2016 in sports in New Mexico